Thomas David "Tommy" Roe (born May 9, 1942) is a retired American rock and pop singer-songwriter.

Best-remembered for his hits "Sheila" (1962) and "Dizzy" (1969), Roe was "widely perceived as one of the archetypal bubblegum artists of the late 1960s, but cut some pretty decent rockers along the way, especially early in his career," wrote the AllMusic journalist Bill Dahl.

Biography

Roe was born and raised in Atlanta, Georgia, United States, where he attended Brown High School. After graduating, he landed a job at General Electric soldering wires.

Tommy Roe first recorded his original song "Sheila" in 1960 for Jud Phillips's Judd label. "I wrote this poem for a girl I had a crush on in high school, and her name was Freda," recalled Roe in 2015. "[Jud Phillips said,] 'Son, I like that song but we gotta do somethin' about that title.' So he sent me home and Aunt Sheila was visiting that weekend. The rest is history!" The Judd single, misspelled "Shelia" and credited to "Tommy Roe and the Satins," is simpler than the more famous hit, with a standard vocal, rhythm combo, and backing chorus. It was a regional hit but did not chart nationally.

Roe re-recorded the song for ABC-Paramount in 1962, with a new hook: an insistent drum paradiddle modeled on the 1957 hit "Peggy Sue." Roe's slight Southern accent and his interpolation of a hiccup in the vocal invited comparisons with Buddy Holly. 

This was deliberate, according to Roe: "Felton (producer Felton Jarvis) said, 'We're gonna do it different. You know there's a vacuum left of Buddy Holly. There are still a lot of Buddy Holly fans out there so we need to draw attention to you, so I'm gonna put Buddy Holly drums on "Sheila."' I wasn't really crazy about that whole idea because I was a big fan of Buddy Holly's and I felt like we were sponging off of him and his whole sound."  The new arrangement of "Sheila" became a Billboard number 1 hit in the U.S. and Australia in 1962. A buildup of global sales of "Sheila" meant that the Recording Industry Association of America did not present the gold record until 1969. When "Sheila" became a hit in 1962, ABC-Paramount asked him to go on tour to promote the hit. He was reluctant to give up his secure job at GE until ABC-Paramount advanced him $5,000.
 
However, in March 1963, the UK music magazine NME reported that he and Chris Montez had both been upstaged by the Beatles and their fans on a 21-day UK tour.  Late that year, Roe scored a Top 10 hit with "Everybody", which reached US number 3 and UK number 9, and "The Folk Singer" (number 4 UK) written by Merle Kilgore was also popular.

Following a more successful tour of the United Kingdom by his friend Roy Orbison, Roe toured there and then moved to England where he lived for several years. In 1964, Roe recorded a song written by Buzz Cason entitled "Diane From Manchester Square", about a girl who worked at EMI House when it was based in London's Manchester Square. Sales of this single in the UK were poor, and it failed to chart. During the 1960s, he had several more Top 40 hits, including 1966's number 8 "Sweet Pea" (number 1 Canada) and number 6 "Hooray for Hazel" (number 2 Canada).

In 1969, his song "Dizzy" went to number 1 on the UK Singles Chart, number 1 in Canada, as well as number 1 on the U.S. Billboard Hot 100. This transatlantic chart-topper sold two million copies by mid-April 1969, giving him his third gold disc award.

Roe guest-starred in an episode of the American sitcom Green Acres, titled "The Four of Spades", airing on November 8, 1969.

His final Top 10 single, a track co-written with Freddy Weller, titled "Jam Up and Jelly Tight", became his fourth gold record, peaking at number 8 in the U.S. and number 5 in Canada in 1970.

Although his style of music declined in popularity with the 1970s mass market, Roe maintained a following and continued to perform at a variety of concert venues, sometimes with 1960s nostalgia rock and rollers such as Freddy Cannon and Bobby Vee. He recorded numerous singles in the late 1970s and 1980s aimed at the country music market. In 1986, Roe was inducted into the Georgia Music Hall of Fame, and his pioneering contribution to the genre has been recognized by the Rockabilly Hall of Fame.

Roe's autobiography, originally published in 2016, named From Cabbagetown to Tinseltown and places in between, was co-written with Michael Robert Krikorian.

On February 7, 2018, Roe officially announced his retirement on his Facebook page with this statement:

Personal life
A resident of Atlanta, Georgia, and Beverly Hills, California, he was married to actress Josette Banzet until her death in 2020. He has a daughter named Cynthia, three grandchildren, and three great-grandchildren who all live in Georgia.

Discography

 Sheila (1962)
 Everybody Likes Tommy Roe (1963)
 Something for Everybody (1964)
 Sweet Pea (1966)
 Phantasy (1967)
 It's Now Winter's Day (1967)
 Heather Honey (1969)
 Dizzy (1969)
 We Can Make Music (1970)
 Beginnings (1971)
 Energy (1976)
 Full Bloom (1977)
 Devil's Soul Pie (2012)
 Confectioner's (2017)

Legacy
The Beatles' bootleg album Live! at the Star-Club in Hamburg, Germany; 1962'', which was recorded (in very low fidelity) in Hamburg in 1962, shortly before they became an international phenomenon, included a version of "Sheila".
"Sweet Pea" is sampled in the song "Lyte As A Rock", appearing on the 1988 album Lyte As A Rock by American rapper MC Lyte.
In 1991, The Wonder Stuff and Vic Reeves released a cover of "Dizzy" that topped the UK Singles Chart.

See also
List of artists who reached number one in the United States
List of artists who reached number one on the UK Singles Chart
List of acts who appeared on American Bandstand
List of performers on Top of the Pops
The History of Rock & Roll
Where the Action Is
List of people from Georgia (U.S. state)

References

External links
 Official website
 Video of Roe performing in Palm Springs, California in 2002
 Mini biography at classicbands.com
 Tommy Roe Interview NAMM Oral History Library (2017)

1942 births
Living people
American expatriates in the United Kingdom
American male pop singers
American male singer-songwriters
Writers from Atlanta
Musicians from Atlanta
ABC Records artists
MGM Records artists
Monument Records artists
Singer-songwriters from Georgia (U.S. state)